is a Japanese actress and gravure idol.

Biography

History
She has played the role of Usagi Tsukino in the Sailor Moon musicals, and has gone on to a varied career. She has played the love interest in Aishiteruze Baby.

Personal life
She was married to former football player Tetsuo Nakanishi from 2007 to 2014.

Filmography 
"Gun Crazy 4" 
Maiko Haaaan!!!
NEO - Office Chuckles (seasons 2-4)
Twin Spica

Video game

References

External links 
    
 official blog

Japanese gravure models
Japanese voice actresses
Japanese television personalities
1981 births
Living people
People from Tokyo
Stardust Promotion artists